Schweiggeria is a genus of flowering plants in the violet family Violaceae, with one or two species, found in eastern Brazil.

Description 
Shrubs, with oblanceolate (wider near tip) leaves. White flowers strongly zygomorphic (bilaterally symmetrical), rarely solitary, in axillary fascicles, with caducous corolla with the bottom petal longer than the others and clawed with a spur that is well exserted. The stamens have free filaments, with the lowest two being calcarate (spurred) and possessing a large dorsal connective appendage that is entire and oblong-ovate. In the gynoecium, the style is rostellate (beaked) or lobed. The fruit is a thick-walled capsule with 3 obovoid seeds per carpel.

Taxonomy 
The genus Schweiggeria was first described by Sprengel, with the single species Schweiggeria fruticosa, placing it in the family Ionidia, named for the genus Ionidium in 1821. In 1846, Lindley classified both Schweiggeria and Ionidium in Violaceae, within the Violales, although Bentham and Hooker (1862) called the family Violarieae.

Historically Schweiggeria was placed within Violaceae in  subfamily Violoideae, tribe Violeae, subtribe Violinae, together with Anchietea, Calyptrion, Noisettia and Viola. But these divisions have been shown to be artificial and not monophyletic. Molecular phylogenetic studies show that Violaceae is best considered as four clades rather than taxonomic ranks. Schweiggeria occurs in Clade I of the family, consisting of Viola, Schweiggeria, Noisettia and Allexis, in which  Schweiggeria and Noisettia are monotypic and form a sister group to Viola.

Etymology 
Sprengel named the genus in honour of his colleague August Friedrich Schweigger (1783–1821).

Subdivision 
Four species have been described;

 Schweiggeria floribunda A.St.-Hil.
 Schweiggeria fruticosa Spreng.
 Schweiggeria mexicana Schltdl.
 Schweiggeria pauciflora (Mart.) Lindl.

of which two, S. fruticosa and S. mexicana are accepted by Plants of the World Online, considering S. floribunda and S. pauciflora as synonyms of S. fruticosa. Other authors consider Schweiggeria to be monotypic for S. fruticosa.

Distribution and habitat 
Eastern Brazil.

References

Bibliography

External links 

Violaceae